Martins Beach is a beach located in San Mateo County, California. The beach is accessible only through Martins Beach Road, which runs from Highway 1 through privately held land. Named after local landowner and farmer Nicholas Martin, the beach is best known for billionaire Vinod Khosla's efforts to close access to the public.

Background

Martins Beach is made up of two shallow coves surrounded by sheer and overhanging cliffs. The coves are divided by "Pelican Rock", a tall and sharply pointed rock cone surrounded by a narrow spit of tidepools. Once part of the Rancho Cañada de Verde y Arroyo de la Purisima, the beach and the land around it were purchased in the 1850s by Nicholas Martin. Martins Beach has historically been a popular family beach and surf spot.

Since the early 1900s, the Deeney family, the land owners, allowed the public free access to the beach, but charged to park vehicles. In the early 1920s, the Deeneys leased the beach to the Watts family. They managed the beach and visitor amenities, including the popular “Watts Inn” on the beach, which still stands. Also included was paid parking by the highway. In the early 1990s, the Deeneys took over management of the beach. They allowed use of the beach in exchange for a parking fee.

Khosla purchased the  property adjacent to the beach for $53 million in 2008 and blocked access. The only way to the beach is on a single road through the surrounding private property. Since 2008, there has been an ongoing legal battle to reopen the beach to the public under the legal theory of implied dedication. Khosla's blocking access to the beach is said to be violating the California Coastal Act yet Khosla is said to be supported by the Fifth Amendment to the United States Constitution which states "nor shall private property be taken for public use, without just compensation." In 2016 Khosla offered to sell a small slice of the property for a public beach path for $30 million, about as much as Khosla spent on the entire property ($32 million) in 2008.

References

Further reading

External links

 
 Martins Beach

Beaches of San Mateo County, California
Land disputes
San Francisco Bay Area beaches
Tourist attractions in San Mateo County, California